Quảng Lưu may refer to several places in Vietnam, including:

 Quảng Lưu, Quảng Bình, a rural commune of Quảng Trạch District.
 , a rural commune of Quảng Xương District.